Jonathan Shainin is a journalist and former editor of the Guardian long read.  For several years, he was at The New Yorker as a staff writer and fact-checker. Between 2010 and 2013, he acted as senior editor at The Caravan in Delhi before returning to The New Yorker to take up ta position as news editor. Shainin was the editor of the Long Read from its inception in 2014. As editor of the Long Read at The Guardian, Shainin expanded the section and helped to bring back the long form article into a large British newspaper. Shainin has said that 'longform stories tend to defy the theory of short attention spans online.'

In 2002, Shainin co-authored The Other Israel: Voices of Refusal and Dissent, with Roane Carey and Tom Segev. It was published by The New Press.

References

External links 

 Jonathan Shainin on The Guardian
 Jonathan Shainin on The New Yorker

British journalists
British newspaper editors
The Guardian people
The New Yorker people
The New Yorker staff writers
Year of birth missing (living people)
Living people